In enzymology, a cellodextrin phosphorylase is an enzyme that catalyzes the chemical reaction

(1,4-beta-D-glucosyl)n + phosphate  (1,4-beta-D-glucosyl)n-1 + alpha-D-glucose 1-phosphate

Thus, the two substrates of this enzyme are (1,4-beta-D-glucosyl)n and phosphate, whereas its two products are (1,4-beta-D-glucosyl)n-1 and alpha-D-glucose 1-phosphate.

This enzyme belongs to GH (glycoside hydrolases) family 94.  The systematic name of this enzyme class is 1,4-beta-D-oligo-D-glucan:phosphate alpha-D-glucosyltransferase. This enzyme is also called beta-1,4-oligoglucan:orthophosphate glucosyltransferase.

References

 

EC 2.4.1
Enzymes of unknown structure